Randal J. Kaufman is the director and a professor of the Degenerative Diseases Program, Neuroscience and Aging Center at Sanford Burnham Prebys Medical Discovery Institute (SBP) and an adjunct professor in the Department of Pharmacology at the UC San Diego School of Medicine.

Biography 
Kaufman received his BA at the University of Colorado and went on to obtain his Ph.D. in pharmacology at Stanford University and undertook postdoctoral studies at the Center for Cancer Research at M.I.T., where he was a Helen Hay Whitney postdoctoral fellow with Nobel laureate Phillip Allen Sharp. From 1994–2011, Kaufman was Professor of Biological Chemistry and Internal Medicine, Endowed Chair of Medicine and Investigator of Howard Hughes Medical Research Institute at the University of Michigan Medical School. He joined SBP in 2011.

Awards and honors 
 1993: Dr. Murray Thelin Award, National Hemophilia Foundation
 1998: International Association Francaise Des Hemophiles Award, "Prix Henri Chaigneau"
 1999: Investigator Recognition Award, Intl. Soc. Thrombosis & Haemostasis (ISTH)
 2000: Distinguished Investigator Award-MI Hemophilia Society
 2003: Van Wezel Prize, European Society of Animal Cell Technology (ESACT)
 2006: Fellow of the American Association for the Advancement of Science
 2007-2017: NIH NIDDK MERIT Award
 2014, 2015: Thomson Reuters World's Most Influential Scientific Minds in Biochemistry & Biology
 2015: Society for Free Radical Research (SFRR), Clinical Science Award
 2016: Endowed Chair in Cell Biology.  SBP Medical Discovery Institute
 2019: Clarivate's Web of Science Group of Highly Cited Researchers
 2021: Clarivate's Web of Science Group of Highly Cited Researchers

References

External links
List of publications on pubmed

Living people
Stanford University faculty
University of California, San Diego faculty
University of Colorado Boulder alumni
Year of birth missing (living people)